Kaminia is a village in Achaea, Greece. It is part of the municipal unit of Vrachnaiika. Kaminia is situated on the Ionian Sea coast, 15 km southwest of Patras, and 6 km east of Kato Achaia. Since the 1980s, the village is bypassed by Greek National Road 9 (Patras - Pyrgos - Kyparissia). Kaminia had a small train station on the currently unexploited Patras–Pyrgos railway.

Population

See also
List of settlements in Achaea

References

Populated places in Achaea
Vrachnaiika